The Nazif Cabinet was led by Ahmed Nazif, who served as prime minister of Egypt from 14 July 2004 to 31 January 2011.

List of ministers

References

Cabinets of Egypt
2004 establishments in Egypt
2011 disestablishments in Egypt
Cabinets established in 2004
Cabinets disestablished in 2011